Ichneutica mollis is a moth of the family Noctuidae. It is endemic to New Zealand and is found from the Coromandel peninsular and Mount Te Aroha southwards including in the South and Stewart Islands. It lives in a variety of habitats including mountainous beech forest, podocarp forest and also grasslands. The larvae feed on grasses and herbs. The adults of this species are on the wing from October to March and are attracted to light and feed on blossoms.

Taxonomy 
It was described by George Howes in 1908 from specimens collected in and around Otago and Southland and originally named Melanchra molis. The male lectotype specimen is held at the Museum of New Zealand Te Papa Tongarewa. In 1988 J. S. Dugdale placed this species within the Graphania genus. When doing so Dugdale suggested that Howes intended the spelling of the species name to be mollis. In 2019 Robert Hoare undertook a major review of New Zealand Noctuidae. During this review the genus Ichneutica was greatly expanded and the genus Graphania was subsumed into that genus as a synonym. Hoare also addressed the spelling of the species name, stating that as mollis is "in the prevailing usage and is attributed to the publication of the original spelling" under Article 33.3.1 of the International Code of Zoological Nomenclature this name is to be treated as the correct spelling. As a result of this review, this species is now known as Ichneutica mollis.

Description 

Howes originally described this species as follows: 
The wingspan of the male of this species is between 34 and 43 mm and for the female of the species is between 38 and 42 mm. I. mollis has pale coloured forewings that are narrow and has dark scaling along the inner edge of the subterminal line that is distinctive.

Distribution 
It is endemic to New Zealand. this species can be found in the North Island from the Coromandel peninsular and Mount Te Aroha southwards, in the South Island and in Stewart Island.

Habitat 
This species lives in a variety of habitats including mountainous beech forest, podocarp forest and also grasslands.

Life history and host species 
The larvae of I. mollis feed on grasses and herbs.

Behaviour 
The adults of this species are on the wing from October to March. They are attracted to light and Howes reports seeing them feed on blossoms.

References
 

Moths described in 1908
Hadeninae
Moths of New Zealand
Endemic fauna of New Zealand
Taxa named by George Howes (entomologist)
Endemic moths of New Zealand